The Municipality of Ankaran is a municipality on the coast of the Adriatic Sea in southwestern Slovenia. Its seat and only settlement is Ankaran. It was formed in 2011, when it was split from the Municipality of Koper.

References

External links

Municipality of Ankaran on Geopedia
Official site

 
Ankaran
2011 establishments in Slovenia